Penacova is a parish in Penacova Municipality, Portugal. The population in 2011 was 3,254, in an area of 32.42 km2.

References

Freguesias of Penacova